Ignacio Calas (born 18 March 1996) is an Argentine rugby union player who plays for the Jaguares. On 21 November 2019, he was named in the Jaguares squad for the 2020 Super Rugby season.

Super Rugby statistics

References

External links
 itsrugby Profile

Jaguares (Super Rugby) players
Rugby union locks
Argentine rugby union players
1996 births
Living people
Melbourne Rebels players
US Carcassonne players